A working holiday visa is a residence permit allowing travellers to undertake employment (and sometimes study) in the country issuing the visa to supplement their travel funds. For many young people, holding a working holiday visa enables them to experience living in a foreign country without undergoing the usual costly expenses of finding work sponsorship in advance or going on expensive university exchange programmes.

Most working holiday visas are offered under reciprocal agreements between certain countries to encourage travel and cultural exchange between their citizens.

There are often several restrictions on this type of visa:
 Many are intended for young travellers and, as such, have an age restriction (usually from 18 to 30 or 35).
 There are usually limits on the type of employment taken or the length of time the traveller can be employed.
 The visa holder is expected to have sufficient funds to live on while employment is sought.
 The visa holder should have some kind of health or travel insurance for the duration of the stay unless the country will cover.

Countries and territories offering working holiday visas
About 60 countries signed bilateral Working Holiday program agreements:
North America： , 
Central America： 
Oceania: , 

Andorra
Citizens of Australia and Canada aged 18 to 30 may apply for a 1-year Andorran working holiday visa in the Principality of Andorra.

Argentina
The working holiday visa allows a stay of up to 12 months and is available to citizens of Australia, Austria, Denmark, France, Germany, Hungary, Ireland, Japan, the Netherlands, New Zealand, Norway, Poland, Portugal, and Sweden in the Argentine Republic. 
The working holiday scheme between young people of Argentina and South Korea are aimed at both citizens interested in applying for a one-year visa to live, work, travel and is to begin in 2019.
Argentina's Working Holiday Program provides opportunities for people aged between 18 and 30 years (inclusive) to holiday in República Argentina and to supplement their travel funds through incidental employment.

Australia

The Working Holiday Visa requires holders to abide by two conditions: First, they cannot work for the same employer for more than 6 months. Second, they cannot engage in any study or training for more than 4 months.
Australia's Working Holiday program provides opportunities for people aged between 18 and 30 years to holiday in Australia and to supplement their travel funds through short-term employment. On November 1, 2018, Australia announced an increase in the age limit to 35 years for Irish and Canadian citizens (on July 1, 2019 for French citizens) applying for a Working Holiday Visa to Australia.
The visa allows a stay of up to 12 months from the date of first entry to Australia, regardless of whether the holder spends the whole time in Australia. There is an optional 12-month extension available for individuals that have completed three months specified work in designated rural areas of Australia.
As of July 1, 2019, Working Holiday Visa holders who undertake six-months of specified work in a specified regional area during their second year may be eligible for a third-year visa.
Any kind of work of a temporary or casual nature is allowed, but work for more than six months with any one employer is usually not permitted. New rules allow Working Holiday Visa holders to work longer than six months with one employer. 
Working holiday visa holders are entitled to study or embark on a training course for a maximum of four months.
Individuals may be subject to medical checks prior to coming to Australia particularly if seeking employment in healthcare or teaching. Applicants will be informed by the online application system if they require medical checks.
The Australian working holiday visa is only available to eligible candidates once in a lifetime, although by undertaking work in a specified industry in regional Australia, it is possible to gain eligibility to an additional 12-month working holiday visa. 
Eligible countries for WHV Australia
Working Holiday Visa Subclass 417: Belgium, Canada, Republic of Cyprus, Denmark, Estonia, Finland, France, Germany, Hong Kong, Republic of China, Republic of Ireland, Italy, Japan, Republic of Korea, Malta, Netherlands, Norway, Sweden, Taiwan, United Kingdom United Kingdom and Northern Ireland.
Work and Holiday Visa Subclass 462: Argentina, Austria, Brazil, Chile, China, Czech Republic, Ecuador, Greece, Hungary, Indonesia, Israel, Luxembourg, Malaysia, Mongolia, Peru, Poland, Portugal, San Marino, Singapore, Slovak Republic, Slovenia, Spain, Switzerland, Thailand, Turkey, Uruguay, United States and Vietnam.
Australia has reciprocal Working Holiday maker arrangements in effect with the United Kingdom, South Korea, Germany, Canada, the Netherlands, Japan, Taiwan, Ireland, Malta, Denmark, Sweden, Norway, Hong Kong, Finland, Cyprus, France, Italy, Belgium, and Estonia Passport holders from these nations may apply for a Working Holiday Visa subclass 417 in Commonwealth of Australia.
Passport holders from Argentina, China, Chile, Czech Republic, Ecuador, Greece, Indonesia, Israel, Malaysia, Luxembourg, Peru, Poland, Portugal, San Marino, Singapore, Slovak Republic, Slovenia, Spain, Thailand, Turkey, United States, Uruguay, Vietnam and Hungary can apply for a work and holiday visa subclass 462, provided they have a tertiary education (except for individuals from the United States). 
New Zealand passport holders can work in Australia with few restrictions under the Trans-Tasman travel arrangement.
On 15 June 2021, the United Kingdom and Australia reached an historic Free Trade Agreement. As part of the agreement, Working Holiday Visa rights for British Citizens in Australia have been expanded with the cut-off age being increased to 35 years old. In addition British citizens will no longer be required to perform agricultural work in order to be able to renew the visa, which will be able to be renewed twice for a maximum stay in Australia of three years.

Austria
Citizens of Argentina, Australia, Canada, Chile, Hong Kong, Israel, Japan, New Zealand, South Korea and Taiwan aged 18–30 can apply for a 6-month and one year Austrian working holiday visa (which also permits study). 
Austria currently has a Youth Workers Exchange Program called Swap available to Canada graduates aged between 18 and 30.

Belgium
Citizens of Australia, Canada, South Korea, New Zealand and Taiwan aged 18–30 may be eligible for a 1-year Belgian working holiday visa in the Belgium Federal Public. 
As Belgium is a Schengen Agreement signatory the 2 year Belgian working holiday visa serves as a Type D national visa which permits the holder to stay and work in the Kingdom of Belgium during the visa's period of validity, as well as travelling in the rest of the Schengen Area for up to 90 days in a 180-day period (i.e. a maximum of 180 days in the 25 other Schengen countries during the visa's 1 year validity).

Brazil
Citizens of France, Germany and New Zealand aged 18–30 can apply for a 1-year Brazilian working holiday visa in the Federative Republic of Brazil.
A new exchange programme for young youths goes into  citizens in sooner 2020 and gives opportunities a limited period of 1 or 2 years to stay, work, trip plus study with life's experiences.

Canada
 The International Experience Canada are now known as IEC (International Experience Canada) work permits.
 Citizens of Australia, Austria, Belgium, Chile, Costa Rica, Croatia, Czech Republic, Denmark, Estonia, France, Germany, Greece, Hong Kong SAR, Ireland, Italy, Japan, South Korea, Latvia, Lithuania, Mexico, the Netherlands, New Zealand, Norway, Poland, Portugal, Slovakia, Slovenia, Spain, Sweden, Switzerland, Taiwan, Ukraine and the United Kingdom are eligible for a Canadian working holiday visa, so long as they fulfill certain criteria which are specific to each country.
 Citizens of the U.S. who are full-time students (or have been within the past 9 months) are eligible for 12-month working holiday permits if obtained through the intermediary organization SWAP.
 Citizens of Poland between the ages of 18 and 35 are eligible from 2009. Canada has also signed an agreement with Spain.
 Citizens of Ukraine between the ages of 18 and 25 are eligible from 2010. There are no restriction for applicants status (non-students).
 Age ranges are 18–30 for most countries; 18–35 for citizens of Australia, Chile, Croatia, Czech Republic, Denmark, France, Germany, Italy, Ireland, New Zealand, Norway, Portugal and Switzerland. Some countries' programmes specify that the applicant must be a full-time student; others do not, and some have separate programmes for students and non-students.
 The type of work allowed and the maximum duration of stay depends on the applicant's country of residence.
 Canada has a quota system. Candidate profiles are drawn at random from pools. This is because in many countries there are many applicants competing for a spot in a very limited period although many have argued that a lottery-type program would be fairer.

There are "rounds of invitations" sent out on a regular basis, as long as there are spots available. If candidates receive an invitation to apply, they have 10 days ONLY to accept or decline it.

Chile
Citizens of Australia, Austria, Canada, the Czech Republic, Denmark, France, Germany, Hungary, Ireland, Japan, New Zealand, Poland, Portugal, South Korea and Sweden aged 18–30 or 35 (in the case of Canada and Hungary) can apply for a 1-year Chilean working holiday visa. Also, if they can provide evidence of holding a medical and comprehensive hospitalisation insurance to remain in force throughout his/her stay in the Republic of Chile.
Also citizens of Colombia, Mexico, Peru can apply to the Pacific Alliance (Chile, Colombia, Mexico, Peru) work and holiday visa in the República de Chile.
Chile and The Grand Duchy of Luxembourg signed a Working Holiday Agreement in July 2018.
Chilean citizens up to 35 years old can apply for a "Young Professionals" visa in Switzerland, where they can stay up to 18 months working in a job related to their degree or vocational training. A job offer is required to apply for this visa.

Colombia
 Citizens of Chile, Mexico, or Peru can apply to the Pacific Alliance work and holiday visa valid for up to one year in República de Colombia. 
Citizens of France aged 18–30 can apply for a one-year Colombian working holiday visa in Colombia.

Costa Rica
Citizens of Canada aged 18–35 are eligible for a working holiday visa in the Republic of Costa Rica, valid for up to 12 months.

Croatia
Citizens of Canada and New Zealand aged 18–30 are eligible for a working holiday visa in the Republic of Croatia, valid for up to one year.

Cyprus
Citizens of Australia aged 18 to 25 are eligible for a working holiday visa in Cyprus, valid for up to 1 year.

Czech Republic
 Citizens of Australia, Canada, Chile, Israel, Japan, New Zealand, South Korea and Taiwan aged 18–30 or 35 (18-26 for Australians) can apply for a 1 or 2-year Czech working holiday visa in the Czech Republic. 
 As the Czech Republic is a Schengen Agreement signatory, the 2 year Czech working holiday visa serves as a Type D national visa, which permits the holder to stay and work in the Czech Republic during the visa's period of validity, as well as travelling in the rest of the Schengen Area for up to 90 days in a 180-day period (i.e. a maximum of 180 days in the 25 other Schengen countries during the visa's 1 year validity).

Denmark
Citizens of Argentina, Australia, Canada, Chile, Japan, New Zealand and South Korea Can apply for a 1-year Danish working holiday visa in the Kingdom of Denmark. Applicants must be between the ages of 18 and 30. 
As Denmark is a Schengen Agreement signatory, the one year Danish working holiday visa serves as a Type D national visa, which permits the holder to stay and work in Kongeriget Danmark during the visa's period of validity, as well as travelling in the rest of the Schengen Area for up to 90 days in a 180-day period (i.e. a maximum of 180 days in the 25 other Schengen countries during the visa's one year validity).

Ecuador

Citizens of Australia aged 18–30 can apply for a 1-year Ecuadorian working holiday visa in the Republic of Ecuador.

Estonia
Under the Memorandum of Understanding between the Government of Estonia and Australia, Canada, Japan, and New Zealand visas are being issued, granting the right to work to 18–30 years old Australian, Canadian, New Zealander, who may stay in the Republic of Estonia for up to 1 year.

Finland
Citizens of Australia, New Zealand aged 18–30 can apply for a 1-year Finnish working holiday visa in Finland. 
 As Finland is a Schengen Agreement signatory, the 1 year Finnish working holiday visa serves as a Type D national visa, which permits the holder to stay and work in the Republic of Finland during the visa's period of validity, as well as travelling in the rest of the Schengen Area for up to 90 days in a 180-day period (i.e. a maximum of 180 days in the 25 other Schengen countries during the visa's 1 year validity).

France
Citizens of Argentina, Australia, Brazil, Canada, Chile, Colombia, Hong Kong, Japan, South Korea, New Zealand, Russia (4-months), Taiwan, Mexico, and Uruguay, aged 18–30 (or 18-35 for Australia, Canada and Argentina passport holders) can apply for a 1-year French working holiday visa (Permis Vacances Travail, usually called PVT).
As France is a Schengen Agreement signatory, the 1 year French working holiday residence permit allows the holder to stay and work in République française during the visa's period of validity, as well as travelling in the rest of the Schengen Area for up to 90 days in a 180-day period (i.e. a maximum of 180 days in the 25 other Schengen countries during the visa's 1 year validity).
Note that citizens of Albania, Andorra, Antigua and Barbuda, Argentina, Bahamas, Barbados, Bosnia and Herzegovina, Brunei, Canada, Chile, Costa Rica, Croatia, El Salvador, Guatemala, Honduras, Israel, Macedonia, Malaysia, Mauritius, Monaco, Montenegro, New Zealand, Nicaragua, Panama, Paraguay, Saint Kitts and Nevis, Saint Vincent and the Grenadines, San Marino, Seychelles, Taiwan, Uruguay and the Vatican City, as well as British Nationals (Overseas), of any age who wish to work in France for up to 90 days can do so without a visa or work permit. Other foreign nationals who are ordinarily visa exempt may be able to work in France without a visa if a valid work permit is held prior to entry.

Georgia
The state programme to work and travel are now available in Georgia.

Germany
Citizens of Argentina, Australia, Brazil, Chile, Hong Kong, Israel, Japan, Republic of Korea (South Korea), New Zealand, Taiwan and Uruguay aged between 18 and 30 may apply for a 1-year German working holiday visa.
Citizens of Canada between 18 and 35 years of age may apply as well. There is no limit on the duration of employment, during the stay of up to 12 months. Evidence of sufficient funds for the first three months is required (i.e. 250 euro per month).
Among other nationalities - the EU, EEA, Australians, Canadians, Israeli, Japanese, South Koreans, New Zealanders, Swiss, and Americans can apply for a residence permit to remain in Bundesrepublik Deutschland if they find long-term work that they are uniquely qualified to do. This is subject to approval by the government employment office - Bundesagentur für Arbeit. (See §16 AufenthV)
As Germany is a Schengen Agreement signatory, the 1-year German working holiday residence permit allows the holder to stay and work in the Federal Republic of Germany during the visa's period of validity, as well as travelling in the rest of the Schengen Area for up to 90 days in a 180-day period (i.e. a maximum of 180 days in the 25 other Schengen countries during the visa's 1 year validity).

Greece
Citizens of Australia and Canada aged 18 to 30 can apply for a one-year Greek working holiday visa in the Hellenic Republic.
As Greece is a Schengen Agreement signatory, the 1 year Greek working holiday visa serves as a Type D national visa, which permits the holder to stay and work in Greece during the visa's period of validity, as well as travelling in the rest of the Schengen Area for up to 90 days in a 180-day period (i.e. a maximum of 180 days in the 25 other Schengen countries during the visa's 1 year validity).

Hong Kong
Hong Kong Special Administrative Region government has the working holiday visa agreements with Australia, Austria, Canada, France, Germany, Hungary, Ireland, Italy, Japan, the Netherlands, New Zealand, South Korea, Sweden, and the United Kingdom.
Agree to hold medical and comprehensive hospitalisation and liability insurance Separately, Hong Kong residents 18 to 30 ages who are British National (Overseas) can apply for UK Youth Mobility Scheme without sponsors.

Hungary
Citizens of Argentina, Australia, Chile, Hong Kong, Japan, New Zealand, South Korea and Taiwan between the ages 18–30 and 35 may apply for a 1-year Hungarian working holiday visa in the Republic of Hungary.
As Hungary is a Schengen Agreement signatory, the 1 year Hungarian working holiday visa serves as a Type D national visa, which permits the holder to stay and work in the State of Hungary during the visa's period of validity, as well as travelling in the rest of the Schengen Area for up to 90 days in a 180-day period (i.e. a maximum of 180 days in the 25 other Schengen countries during the visa's 1 year validity).

Iceland
Citizens of Japan and the United Kingdom aged 18 to 30 may apply for a 1-year Icelandic working holiday visa in the Republic of Iceland.

India
 In the context of the Australia-India Economic Cooperation and Trade Agreement, Australia has agreed to extend access to the Work and Holiday (subclass 462) visa to up to 1,000 Indian citizens each year.
 Within two years, Australia will put in place arrangements to allow eligible Indian citizens aged between 18 and 30 to apply for a Work and Holiday visa to visit Australia for one year and undertake short-term work and study while holidaying.
 As part of a new agreement with India, the UK government has agreed (albeit in a non-binding agreement) to participate in a scheme aimed at allowing increased mobility for a limited number of young people between India and the UK. It has some similarities to the existing Youth Mobility Scheme, and will allow up to 3,000 Indian nationals per year aged between 18 and 30 to come to the UK to live and work for a period of up to two years. In return, 3,000 UK nationals a year will be able to do the same in India.

Indonesia
Citizens of Australia aged 18–30 with functional Indonesian language skills and at least two years of university education can apply for a 12-month Work and Holiday visa in the Republic of Indonesia.

Ireland
 Citizens of Argentina, Chile, Hong Kong, Japan, New Zealand, South Korea, Taiwan, the U.S. and Uruguay aged 18–30 (inclusive) and of Australia aged 18–35 (inclusive) may be eligible for a one-year Irish working holiday visa in the Republic of Ireland.
 Citizens of Canada between the ages of 18-35 are eligible for a two-year working holiday visa.

Israel

Citizens of Australia, Austria, the Czech Republic, Germany, New Zealand and South Korea between the aged 18–30 can apply for a 1-year Israeli working holiday visa in the State of Israel.

Italy
Citizens of Australia, Hong Kong, New Zealand and South Korea aged between 18 and 30 can apply for a 1- year Italian working holiday visa in Repubblica Italiana.
Citizens of Canada aged between 18 and 35 can apply for a two-year Italian working holiday visa in the Italian Republic.
As Italy is a Schengen Agreement signatory the two year Italian working holiday visa serves as a Type D national visa, which permits the holder to stay and work in the Italian republic during the visa's period of validity, as well as travelling in the rest of the Schengen Area for up to 90 days in a 180-day period (i.e. a maximum of 180 days in the 25 other Schengen countries during the visa's 1 year validity).

Japan

 Japan initiated its working holiday programmes with Australia, New Zealand, Canada, the Republic of Korea, France, Germany, the United Kingdom, Ireland, Denmark, Taiwan, Hong Kong, Norway, Poland, Portugal, Slovakia, Austria, Hungary, Spain, Argentina, Chile, Iceland, Czech Republic, Lithuania, Sweden, Estonia, the Netherlands and Latvia.
 Japan's Working Holiday Programmes are designed to foster young people with global perspective and enhance friendly relationship between Japan and partner countries/regions by providing opportunities for the young people to deepen their understanding about partner countries/regions.
 Japan's Working Holiday participants are allowed to work for a certain period of their stay in order to cover the cost of travel funds to travel and stay in partner countries/regions.
 The following 15 countries are the detailed information on the Working Holiday Programmes in the State of Japan.
 Citizens from Australia, Canada, Denmark, France, Germany, Hong Kong, Ireland, South Korea, New Zealand, Norway, Slovakia, Poland, Portugal, Taiwan and the United Kingdom who are between the ages of 18–30.
 A one-year visa may be granted to citizens of Denmark, France, Germany, Ireland, South Korea, Norway, Poland, Portugal, Slovakia, and the United Kingdom—with no extension possible. A six-month visa may be granted to citizens of Australia which can be extended twice and once for citizens of New Zealand and Canada.

Latvia
Citizens of Australia, Canada, Japan, and New Zealand between the aged 18–30 (18–35 for Canada) can apply for a 1-year Latvian working holiday visa in the Latvian Republic.  

Lithuania
Citizens of Canada, Japan, New Zealand Ages of 18-30 or 35 inclusively on the date the application can get a 1-year Lithuanian working holiday visa.
As the Republic of Lithuania is a Schengen Agreement signatory, the 1 year Lithuanian working holiday visa serves as a Type D national visa, which permits the holder to stay and work in Lithuania during the visa's period of validity, as well as travelling in the rest of the Schengen Area for up to 90 days in a 180-day period (i.e. a maximum of 180 days in the 25 other Schengen countries during the visa's 1 year validity).

Luxembourg
The Grand Duchy of Luxembourg (Grand Duke) signed bilateral agreements with Australia, Canada, New Zealand, and Taiwan which allow a limited number of young citizens between 18 and 30 years of age from these countries to undertake a stay of one year in le Grand-Duché de Luxembourg.
Luxembourg signed a Working Holiday Agreement with Chile in July 2018.
The Governments of Luxembourg and South Korea decided to strengthen their efforts to expand exchanges between both youth Luxembourgish & Koreans of  including shaping the promotion of a working holiday agreement and this would be signed as soon as possible within 2020.

Malaysia
Citizens of New Zealand aged 18–30 can apply for a 1-year Malaysian working holiday visa in the Federation of Malaysia.
Citizens of Australia aged 18–30 can apply for a 1-year Malaysian working holiday visa under the work and holiday visa programme for the Federation of Malaysia.

Malta
Citizens of Australia and New Zealand aged 18–30 can apply for a 1-year Maltese working holiday visa in the Republic of Malta.

Mexico
Citizens of Canada, France, Germany, South Korea, New Zealand are eligible for a Mexican working holiday visa in Mexico valid for 1 year or some kind of 2 year. Applicants must be between the ages of 18–29 and 30. 
Citizens of Chile, Colombia, Peru are eligible for the Pacific Alliance working holiday visa in the United Mexican States valid for 1 year to Chileans, Colombians, Peruvians aged 18–30.

Monaco
British citizens between the aged 18 to 30 can apply for a two-year Monégasque working holiday visa in the Principality of Monaco.

Netherlands
Residents of countries within the European Union can come to reside in the Netherlands without a residence permit. Immigrants from some countries such as Australia, Canada, South Korea, New Zealand and the U.S. 
Citizens of Argentina, Australia, Canada, Hong Kong, Japan, New Zealand, South Korea, Taiwan and Uruguay between the ages of 18-30 are eligible for a 1-year Dutch working holiday visa in the Kingdom of the Netherlands. 
As the Netherlands is a Schengen Agreement signatory, the 1 year Dutch working holiday visa serves as a Type D national visa, which permits the holder to stay and work in the Netherlands during the visa's period of validity, as well as travelling in the rest of the Schengen Area for up to 90 days in a 180-day period (i.e. a maximum of 180 days in the 25 other Schengen countries during the visa's 1 year validity).

New Zealand
Available to the following 45 countries or region, Citizens of Argentina, Austria, Belgium, Brazil, Canada, Chile, China, Croatia, Czech Republic, Denmark, Estonia, Finland, France, Germany, Hong Kong, Hungary, Ireland, Israel, Italy, Japan, South Korea, Latvia, Lithuania, Luxembourg, Malaysia, Malta, Mexico, Netherlands, Norway, Peru, Philippines, Poland, Portugal, Singapore (6-months-work exchange programme), Slovakia, Slovenia, Spain, Sweden, Taiwan, Thailand, Turkey, United Kingdom, United States, Uruguay and Vietnam. 
No working holiday visa is required for Australia citizens. All Australian citizens, regardless of their age or education (but subject to being of good character), are granted a residence class visa at the border upon entering New Zealand by virtue of the Trans-Tasman Travel Arrangement. 
Citizens of Canada and the United Kingdom can work in New Zealand for up to 23 months on a working holiday visa; citizens of other countries can work up to 12 months.
Citizens of most countries have to be at least 18 and not more than 30. However, Canada, Argentina, Chile, Uruguay, Finland, Czech Republic, Slovakia and Hungary have to be at least 18 and not more than 35 years old.
Most travellers can enroll in one training or study course of up to three months duration during their visit. Australian citizens can study in New Zealand indefinitely.

Norway
Citizens of Argentina, Australia, Japan and New Zealand who are between the ages of 18-30 (inclusive) are eligible for a one-time, Norwegian working holiday visa in the Kingdom of Norway. 
Citizens of Canada who are the ages of 18-35 are eligible for a 1-year Nordic working holiday visa in Kongeriket Norge.

Peru
Citizens of Chile, Colombia, Mexico are eligible for the Pacific Alliance working holiday visa in República del Perú. 
Citizens of Australia, France, New Zealand, and Portugal aged 18–30 can apply for a one-year Peruvian working holiday visa in the Republic of Peru.

Philippines
Citizens of New Zealand aged 18–30 can apply for a 1-year Philippine working holiday visa in the Republic of the Philippines.

Poland
Poland and South Korea have signed the working holiday visa program This agreement will start in April 2018 in both nations.
Citizens of Canada Ages of 18 to 35 years old are eligible the Polish working holiday scheme in the Republic of Poland.
Citizens of Argentina, Australia, Chile, Japan, New Zealand and Taiwan between 18 and 30 years old both inclusive at the time of application can apply for the Polish working holiday visa.
As Poland is a Schengen Agreement signatory the 2 year Polish working holiday visa serves as a Type D national visa which permits the holder to stay and work in Rzeczpospolita Polska during the visa's period of validity as well as travelling in the rest of the Schengen Area for up to 90 days in a 180-day period (i.e. a maximum of 180 days in the 25 other Schengen countries during the visa's one year validity).

Portugal
Citizens of Argentina, Australia, Canada, Chile, Japan, New Zealand, Peru, South Korea and the United States aged 18 to 30 (18 to 35 for Canada) can apply for a two-year Portuguese working holiday visa in the Portuguese Republic. 
As Portugal is a Schengen Agreement signatory the 2 year Portuguese working holiday visa serves as a Type D national visa, which permits the holder to stay and work in República Portuguesa during the visa's period of validity, as well as travelling in the rest of the Schengen Area for up to 90 days in a 180-day period (i.e. a maximum of 180 days in the 25 other Schengen countries during the visa's one year validity).

Romania
The Romanian government has the working holiday programme agreement with the Republic of Korea thus citizens of South Korea between the ages of 18 to 30 year olds can apply for a 1-year Romanian working holiday visa in Romania.

Russia
Citizens of France between the aged 18 to 30 can apply for a four-month Russian working holiday visa in the Russian Federation.

San Marino
The working holiday visa of the Republic of San Marino is available to citizens of Australia, Canada, and the United Kingdom for up to one year.

Singapore
Undergraduate university students or recent graduates from universities in Australia, France, Germany, Hong Kong, Japan, Netherlands, New Zealand, Switzerland, United Kingdom or United States aged between 18-25 can apply for a 6-month Work Holiday Pass under Singapore's Work Holiday Programme. Uniquely, there are no stated restrictions on nationality, only that the applicant be a student or graduate from a university in the listed countries.
Citizens of Australia aged between 18 and 30 with who have studied at university for at least 2 years may also apply for a 12-month visa under the Work and Holiday Visa Programme.
The universities must be recognised by the university's home government.

Slovakia
Citizens of Australia, Canada, Japan, New Zealand and Taiwan aged 18–30 or 35 can apply for a 1-year Slovak working holiday visa in the Slovak Republic. 
As Slovakia is a Schengen Agreement signatory the 1 year Slovakian working holiday visa serves as a Type D national visa which permits the holder to stay and work in Slovenská republika during the visa's period of validity as well as travelling in the rest of the Schengen Area for up to 90 days in a 180-day period (i.e. a maximum of 180 days in the 25 other Schengen countries during the visa's 1 year validity).

Slovenia
Citizens of Australia,(18-31) and New Zealand aged 18–30 can apply for a 1-year Slovene working holiday visa in the Republic of Slovenia.
 As Slovenia is a Schengen Agreement signatory the 1 year Slovenian working holiday visa serves as a Type D national visa which permits the holder to stay and work in Republic of Slovenia during the visa's period of validity as well as travelling in the rest of the Schengen Area for up to 90 days in a 180-day period (i.e. a maximum of 180 days in the 25 other Schengen countries during the visa's 1 year validity).

South Africa
The Republic of South Africa, from where 17,000 young people previously visited the UK under the Working Holiday scheme, is also not part of the British Tier 5 Youth Mobility Scheme. However, university level students and recent graduates of any nationality are eligible to apply for a 6-month Internship in Britain through BUNAC (officially known as the BUNAC Blue Card Internship Programme).
Canadian students may work in the Republic of South Africa for a 12-month period through Swap.

South Korea
Citizens of Argentina, Australia, Austria, Belgium, Brazil, Canada, Chile, Czechia, Denmark, Estonia, Finland, France, Germany, Hong Kong, Hungary, Ireland, Israel, Italy, Japan, Latvia, Lithuania, Luxembourg, Netherlands, New Zealand, Poland, Portugal, Romania, Slovakia, Spain, Sweden, Taiwan, UK, USA are able to participate the Korea WHP for a 1 or 2 year. Quota has unlimit to Australia, Chile, Denmark, Germany, Sweden.

The South Korea with Brunei, Cambodia, East Timor, Indonesia, Laos, Malaysia, Myanmar, (Burma) Philippines, Singapore, Thailand, Vietnam will participation a WHS.

Note that citizens of Argentina, Armenia, Austria, Azerbaijan, Brunei, Bulgaria, Cambodia, Cameroon, Chile, China, Colombia, Czech Republic, Egypt, Finland, France, Greece, Hungary, India, Indonesia, Israel, Japan, Malaysia, (since 1965) Mexico, Mongolia, Morocco, Pakistan, Philippines, Poland, Qatar, Russia, Saudi Arabia, Singapore, Slovakia, Spain, Sudan, Tunisia, Türkiye, UAE, Vietnam are participating an IYE (International Youth Exchange) program.

Spain
Citizens of Australia, Japan, and New Zealand aged 18–30 can apply for a one-year Spanish working holiday visa in the Kingdom of Spain.
Spain has signed an agreement with Canada called the "Youth Mobility Program" that allows 18 to 35 year olds to spend up to a year in Spain. The annual visa acceptance quota for this program is 1000.
Citizens of Spain and South Korea have reached an agreement on a working holiday visa program will allow one-thousand young people from Korea and Spain to live, work, travel in the other country for up to a year and is also set to take effect in February or March 2018 after necessary procedures are carried out.
As Spain is a Schengen Agreement signatory, the 1 year Spanish working holiday visa serves as a Type D national visa, which permits the holder to stay and work in Spain during the visa's period of validity, as well as travelling in the rest of the Schengen Area for up to 90 days in a 180-day period (i.e. a maximum of 180 days in the 25 other Schengen countries during the visa's 1 year validity).

Sweden
The Swedish governments offers a working holiday visa program to Argentina, Australia, Canada, Chile, Hong Kong, Japan, New Zealand, South Korea and Uruguay passport holders for up to 1 year in the Kingdom of Sweden. 
As Sweden is a Schengen Agreement signatory the twenty four months Swedish working holiday visa serves as a Type D national visa, which permits the holder to stay and work in Konungariket Sverige during the visa's period of validity, as well as travelling in the rest of the Schengen Area for up to 90 days in a 180-day period (i.e. a maximum of 180 days in the 25 other Schengen countries during the visa's 1 year validity).

Switzerland
Citizens of Canada (aged 18–35) and Chile (18-30) can apply for a 1-year Swiss working holiday visa in Swiss Confederation.

Taiwan

 Since the program was launched, Taiwan has signed working holiday agreements with 16 countries, i.e., Australia, Austria, Belgium, Canada, the Czech Republic, France, Germany, Hungary, Ireland, Japan, Korea, Luxembourg, the Netherlands, New Zealand, Poland, Slovakia, and the United Kingdom. As agreements may differ with regard to the quota of participants, age restrictions, and maximum duration of stay, foreign youth are advised to check the terms of the agreement that pertains to their home country and abide by Taiwan's laws and regulations.

Thailand
Citizens of Australia and New Zealand are eligible for a 1-year Thai working holiday visa in the Kingdom of Thailand.
Applicants must be aged between 18 and 30, and have tertiary qualifications (full-time courses with at least 3 years of study).
Applicants must have an Australian passport valid for at least 6 months or a New Zealand passport valid for at least 12 months, a return ticket or sufficient funds to purchase one, and funds of at least A$5,000 or NZ$7,000, and must be in good health and hold comprehensive medical insurance.
Applications must be made at the Thai Embassy in Canberra or the Thai Consulate in Sydney for Australian nationals, or at the Thai Embassy in Wellington for New Zealand nationals.

Turkey
The Turkish working holiday visa allows a stay of up to 12 months and is available to Australia and New Zealand citizens.
The Ministry of Foreign Affairs of Turkey's Working Holiday Program provides opportunities for young people aged between 18 and 30 years old (inclusive) to holiday in the Republic of Turkey and to supplement their travel funds through incidental employment.

Ukraine
The Ukrainian Government offering the working holiday visas to citizens of Canada aged 18–25 year olds can apply for a 1-year Ukrainian working holiday visa.

United Kingdom
On 27 November 2008, a number of youth mobility schemes were combined into Tier 5 (Youth Mobility) as part of the Points-Based Immigration System. The previous Working Holidaymaker Scheme for Commonwealth nationals was merged with other schemes: au pairs, BUNAC, the Gap Year entrants concession, the Japan Youth Exchange Scheme and the concession for research assistants to MPs. Participating countries must offer a reciprocal scheme to young British nationals. The scheme has ten participating countries: Australia, Canada, Hong Kong, Iceland, Japan, Monaco, New Zealand, San Marino, South Korea, Taiwan and British nationals who are not citizens of the UK including British Nationals (Overseas), British Overseas Territory Citizens and British Overseas Citizens can also apply in the United Kingdom of Great Britain and Northern Ireland.
The 24 month validity period runs continuously from the date from which the Entry Clearance is valid. Regardless of any time spent travelling outside the UK. This period cannot be extended nor can it be put on hold.
Although participants can undertake self-funded study while they are in the UK, either part-time or full-time, they cannot switch in the UK to student immigration status. Someone who wishes to stay longer in the UK to complete a full-time course must apply in their home country for a student visa. If someone does complete a course of study in the UK during their Tier 5 leave, they will not be eligible to switch to the Tier 1 (Post Study Work) scheme within the UK.

Uruguay
The Uruguayan working holiday visa programmes allows a stay of up to 12 months and is available to Australia, France, Germany, Ireland, the Netherlands, New Zealand and Sweden citizens in the Oriental-Eastern Republic of Uruguay. 
Uruguay's Working Holiday Program provides opportunities for people aged between 18 and 30 years (inclusive) to holiday in Uruguay and to supplement their travel funds through incidental employment.

Vietnam
The Vietnamese working holiday visa allows a stay of up to 1 year and is available to citizens of Australia and New Zealand in the Socialist Republic of Vietnam.

See also
Gap year

References

Visas
Employment of foreign-born
Lists by country